Picos is a municipality in the state of Piauí in the Northeast region of Brazil. Picos is the state's third-largest city, located in the south-central region of Piauí and is the most economically developed city in the region. The city's financial prosperity, combined with its geographical location, gives Picos a "commercial hub" status, especially for fuel and honey (Picos is known as the "capital of honey"). As of 2020, the population was approximately 78,431.

Climate 

Demographics 
The population of the city of Picos is currently 78,431 inhabitants (IBGE 2020), and 58,307 in urban areas and 15,107 in rural areas, thus characterizing the third largest city from Piaui. It has a population density of 137.23 inhabitants / km ².

Neighborhoods and Villages

Villages 
Villages include Coroatá, Fátima do Piauí, Gameleira dos Rodrigues, Lagoa Grande, Mirolândia, Morrinhos, Samambaia, Saquinho, Sipaúba, Tapera, Torrões e Val Paraíso and Lagoa Comprida.

Neighborhoods 
Named neighborhoods include Aerolândia, Altamira, Aroeiras do Matadouro, Bairro de Fátima, Boa Sorte, Boa Vista, Bomba, Canto da Várzea, Catavento, Centro, Condurú, DNER, Ingazeira, Ipueiras, Jardim Natal, Junco, Malva, Morada do Sol, Morro da AABB, Pantanal, Vila do Flamengo, Paraibinha, Paroquial (Chão dos Padres), Parque de Exposição, Passagem das Pedras, Pedrinhas, Pedro Brito, São José, São Sebastião (Malvinas), Trisidela and Umari e Unha de Gato (3º BECnst).

Transportation 
The city is served by Sen. Helvídio Nunes Airport.

Education

Schools 

Public schools include E. Téc. Est. Petrônio Portela (PREMEM), Esc. Normal Official De Picos, U.E. Antonio Marques, U.E. Araújo Luz, U.E. Cel, Fco. Santos, U.E. Coelho Rodrigues, U.E. Dirceu Mendes Arcoverde, U.E. Jorge Leopoldo, U.E. José De Deus Barros, U.E. Julieta Neiva Nunes, U.E. Landri Sales, E. Pol. Marcos Parente, U.E. Mario Martins, U.E Miguel Lidiano, U.E. Ozildo Albano, U.E. Petrônio Portela, U.E. Poliv. Des. José Vidal Freitas, U.E. Teresinha Nunes, U.E. Urbano Eulálio Filho and Ceja José De Sousa Bispo.

Private schools include Colégio São Lucas, Colégio Decisão, Colégio Machado de Assis, Colégio Antares, Instituto Monsenhor Hipólito (Colégio das Irmãs), Colégio Santa Rita, Instituto Nivardo Moura, Instituto Professor Augusto Rogério and CNA Idiomas language school franchise.

Colleges and Universities 
 UESPI - State University of Piauí
 UFPI - Federal University of Piauí
 IESRSA - Institute of Higher Education R. Sá
 IFPI - Federal Institute for Education, Science and Technology
 ISEAF - Institute of Education Antonino Freire
 UNOPAR - Universidade Norte do Paraná

Federal Institutes of Education and Learning 
 SENAI/FIEP (National Service of Industrial Learning)
 Senac (National Service of Commercial Learning)
 SESI (Industrial Social Service)
 SEST/Senate (Social Service Transportation / National Service Learning Transportation)

References

See also
List of municipalities in Piauí

Municipalities in Piauí
Populated places established in 1890